Sports Illustrated TV was the first 24-hour sports network in Asia. Launched on October 1, 2009 by Yes Television, the channel was relaunched in 2016 by the newly formed joint-venture between ASN Ltd. and Meredith Corporation (owners of the Sports Illustrated magazine).

Sports Illustrated featured a wide range of sports content from the world's biggest brands in sports.  It managed 3,200 hours of licensed sports content including NFL (including the Super Bowl), NHL, NCAA March Madness, NASCAR and Extreme Sports.  It also had exclusive game rights to certain NCAA football, NCAA basketball and other major collegiate events.

Sports Illustrated reaches 11 territories – Cambodia, Laos, India, Indonesia, Macau, Malaysia, Myanmar, Taiwan, Thailand, Singapore and Sri Lanka.

As of 2018, the channel was no longer available in Hong Kong and Philippines.

It was announced that on May 1, 2019, Sports Illustrated TV ceased its transmission at the following day in the rest of the Asia. On June 21, 2019, it will no longer be available in Singapore and Thailand.

Final Programming Broadcast by Sports Illustrated TV

NHL
NHL Tonight
NCAA Football & Basketball
National Lacrosse League
Better Than Four
Dream Car Garage
Epic TV
NASCAR Xfinity Series (Races & Highlights)
NASCAR Camping World Truck Series (Races & Highlights)
NASCAR Whelen Euro Series (Races & Highlights) (2016 onwards)
NFL 
NFL Total Access
NFL GameDay
Super Bowl
NFL programming get excluded in Thailand (True Visions), Hong Kong (Now TV) and Taiwan (Sportcast)
SI Now
SI Fansided

References

 
Cable television in Hong Kong
Defunct television channels
Television channels and stations established in 2009
Television channels and stations disestablished in 2019
Joint ventures